Egill Örn Egilsson ASC  (born 31 August 1966), known as Eagle Egilsson, is an Icelandic television director and cinematographer.

Life and career
Egill was born in Reykjavík, Iceland, and studied filmmaking at Columbia College Hollywood, a Los Angeles film school. As a cinematographer, he is perhaps best known for his work on The Wire, CSI: Miami (where he was also a co-producer), Dark Blue and numerous television commercials and music videos. In 2008, he directed the Heroes spin-off miniseries Heroes: Destiny.

Since 2011, Egill has mostly worked as a director. He directed numerous episodes of The CW action series Nikita, including the series finale, as well as episodes of Fringe, Alcatraz and Dark Blue. Egill was also a frequent director on seasons 4-6 of CSI: Miami, "Gotham" and has directed several episodes of the original CSI series, among others.

Awards and honors

Egill is a four-time nominee for the American Society of Cinematographers Outstanding Achievement Awards, and carried home the award in the television category in 2010 for the Dark Blue episode "Venice Kings", which he also directed. Later that year, he became the first Icelander to be admitted into the ASC, at the age of 44.

References

External links

1966 births
Living people
American cinematographers
American television directors
Eagle Egilsson
Eagle Egilsson
Eagle Egilsson